"Trial by Fire" is a song by the American heavy metal band Saul. It was released in November 27, 2019 on their debut album Rise as Equals as the second single.

Charts

References 

2019 singles
2019 songs
Saul (band) songs